Jean Hale (born Carol Jane Hale; December 27, 1938 – August 3, 2021) was an American actress.

Early years 
Hale was born on December 27, 1938, in Salt Lake City, Utah. Her parents were Stanton G  and Doris (Norrell) Hale. Jean Hale was raised a Mormon. She studied at the University of Utah and at Skidmore College for Women, then moved to New York City. There she learned from Sydney Pollack at the Neighborhood Playhouse.

Film and television
In the early 1960s, Hale appeared in commercials and danced on the television series Sing Along with Mitch.

In films, Hale played Miriam Stark in Taggart (1964), Cheryl Barker in The Oscar (1966), Myrtle in The St. Valentine's Day Massacre (1967) and Lisa in In Like Flint (1967). She also appeared in several television shows in the 1960s. She made two 1965 appearances on Perry Mason; in both roles she played Perry's client: Reggie Lansfield in "The Case of the Murderous Mermaid," (Season 8, Episode 23) and Carla Chaney in "The Case of the Laughing Lady." Other television appearances include The Alfred Hitchcock Hour, Batman, Bob Hope Presents the Chrysler Theatre, Bonanza,  The Fugitive, Hawaii Five-O, McHale's Navy, My Favorite Martian ("The Atom Misers", air date 12/15/63), The Men from Shiloh in 1971, Hogan's Heroes, and The Wild Wild West ("The Night That Terror Stalked The Town", S1 Ep10, as Marie)

In 1984, Hale and Gino Tanasescu created Coleman-Tanasescu Entertainment, a production company, and in 2000 she began heading her own production company.

Personal life
She married Dabney Coleman in 1961. They had three children: Quincy Coleman, Randy Coleman, and Kelly Johns. They divorced in 1984.

Hale died of natural causes on August 3, 2021, in Santa Monica, California, at the age of 82.

Filmography

References

External links

 

1938 births
2021 deaths
American film actresses
American television actresses
Actresses from Salt Lake City
Latter Day Saints from Utah
20th-century American actresses
21st-century American women